Okdiario is a Spanish digital newspaper founded in September 2015 by the journalist Eduardo Inda. Its editorial ideology is aligned with neoliberalism and Spanish nationalism. The newspaper's motto is El sitio de los inconformistas (the place of nonconformists).

Inda approached the creation of this media outlet after leaving his position as deputy editor of the newspaper El Mundo, contributing €500,000 of capital, corresponding to the compensation received after his departure. The following year, Okdiarios publishing company received €300,000 from the state public entity  in the form of a participative loan on advantageous terms, despite its outstanding debts.

The audience measurement company Comscore placed the number of Okdiario visits in May 2021 at 12 million, consolidating it as the eighth most viewed digital media outlet in Spain.

Okdiario is known for promoting falsehoods and has been at the forefront of several controversies related to misinforming and fabricating stories. According to a study by the University of Valencia published in November 2017, it is Spain's worst rated media outlet.

References

External links
 

2015 establishments in the Community of Madrid
Companies based in Madrid
European news websites
Newspapers published in Spain
Publications established in 2015
Spanish news websites